Lucas Sebastian Espindola (born 29 June 1994) is an Argentinian footballer who is currently playing for Juventud Antoniana.

References

External links
 
 Profile at Base De Datos Del Futbol Argentino 

1994 births
Living people
Argentine footballers
Argentine expatriate footballers
Expatriate footballers in Honduras
Expatriate footballers in Malaysia
All Boys footballers
PKNS F.C. players
Malaysia Super League players
Association football forwards
Argentine expatriate sportspeople in Honduras
Argentine expatriate sportspeople in Malaysia
Footballers from Buenos Aires